Zhijing River Bridge was the highest arch bridge in the world upon its completion in 2009. The 294 metres high bridge in the Three Gorges region of China carries the  G50 Shanghai–Chongqing Expressway across the valley of the Zhijing River, a northern tributary of the Qing River. With a main span of 430 metres the bridge is also one of the 20 longest arch bridges in the world. The bridge is located between the towns of Yesanguan and Dazhiping in Badong County of the Enshi Tujia and Miao Autonomous Prefecture of Hubei Province. The world's highest bridge the Sidu River Bridge is situated only 20km eastwards along the G50 Shanghai–Chongqing Expressway.

See also
List of highest bridges in the world
List of longest arch bridge spans

References

Arch bridges in China
Bridges in Hubei
Badong County
2009 establishments in China
Bridges completed in 2009